Ben Salisbury (born 1970) is a British composer,  particularly known for his work in film and television. He has also worked as a co-writer, arranger and musician with a number of bands. He studied music at Newcastle University and Bournemouth University.

Career

Notable television credits include the BAFTA nominated David Attenborough series The Life of Mammals  and Life in the Undergrowth, and the BAFTA-winning series Life in Cold Blood. He was nominated for an Emmy Award for his score for the Wildlife on One film Operation Dung Beetle 

Salisbury appears as co-writer, string arranger and musician on the Malachai album "Return To The Ugly Side"  and The Beekeepers album "Apiculture". He also co-wrote the album "Drokk: Music Inspired By Mega City One" with Portishead's Geoff Barrow, and writes and records as one half of the duo Dolman with Scott Hendy. Dolman released their eponymous debut album on Inflection Point records in June 2014.

In 2012 Salisbury composed the score for the documentary feature film Beyonce: Life Is But A Dream directed by Beyoncé - a behind the scenes look at the singer's life and music.

Together with Geoff Barrow, he scored the feature film Ex Machina, Alex Garland’s directorial debut, released in the UK in January 2015. Salisbury and Barrow won the 2016 Ivor Novello award for Best Original Score for Ex Machina. The two teamed up again to score Garland's Annihilation (2018) and TV series Devs.

Credits

References

External links
 bensalisbury.co.uk

British composers
1970 births
Living people
Alumni of Newcastle University
Alumni of Bournemouth University